Maria Catharina Wiik (3 August 1853 – 19 June 1928) was a Finnish painter. She  worked principally with still life, genre images, landscape paintings and  portraits.

Biography

Wiik was born in Helsinki. She was the daughter of architect Erik Johan Wik (or Wiik) (1804–1876) and his wife Gustava Fredrika Meyer. She was born and grew up in Brunnsparken and attended the Swedish language school Svenska fruntimmersskolan in Helsingfors. She then studied drawing with art professor  Adolf von Becker. 

Encouraged by her family, she studied art during 1874–1875 at the Academy of Fine Arts in Helsinki.
In 1875, she continued her art studies in Paris under Tony Robert-Fleury at the Académie Julian, one of the few private schools accepting women at the time.

From 1875 and in 1880 she became a substitute teacher at the Academy of Fine Arts of Helsinki. Her early paintings accepted for the Paris Salon in 1880 were portraits. In 1881, she painted a series of small paintings with a more psychological atmosphere including minute details. In spring 1889, she returned to Paris with her friend, the painter Helene Schjerfbeck to work among others with Puvis de Chavannes. In 1883–1884, they painted in England and then in 1889 at St Ives in Cornwall.

Her last trip to Paris took place in 1905. The rest of her life she spent in Helsinki. Her vision deteriorated, and in 1925 she underwent an eye surgery. Wiik died in Helsinki in 1928.

Works

See also
Golden Age of Finnish Art
Finnish art

References

External links

Maria Wiik at the Académie Julian website
Maria Wiik on artnet

1853 births
1928 deaths
Artists from Helsinki
19th-century Finnish painters
20th-century Finnish painters
19th-century Finnish women artists
20th-century Finnish women artists
Finnish women painters